Iranian complainant mothers (Persian: مادران دادخواه) or Iranian Mothers for Justice are mothers whose children were killed by the agents of the Islamic Republic in various protests in Iran. These women are the mothers of people who were killed during the 2017–2018 Iranian protests, the 2019–2020 Iranian protests, the 2021-2022 Iranian protests and the downing of the Ukraine Flight by the Islamic Revolutionary Guards Air Defense.

Also, the mothers of those killed in the 1988 executions of Iranian political prisoners, who are also known as Mothers of Khavaran, and the mothers of those killed during the 2009 Iranian presidential election protests, known as Mothers of Laleh Park and other mothers of those killed during the rule of the Islamic Republic in Iran can be called Iranian mothers for justice.

Justice demands 
By protesting and participating in various gatherings, these women demand justice and the identification and trial of the perpetrators of these bloody events and the overthrow of the Islamic Republic of Iran. 

Gohar Eshghi, the mother of Sattar Beheshti, an Iranian blogger who was killed by torture in a detention center in November 2012, is one of the mothers of the petitioners. After the death of his son, he tried hard to bring Sattar's killer or killers to justice. He turned his son's death into a media issue and caused a wide controversy in the ruling political system of Iran. 

After Mohammad Taheri was killed in the protests of November 2019, his parents were among those who, without fear, sued for their son's blood. On the eve of Iran's presidential election in June 2021, his mother, Zainab Mohammadi, announced in a video that her vote was not for the Islamic Republic. She said: "We neither forgive nor forget."

Arresting Iranian mothers for justice 
On the 12th of June 2021, Nahid Shirpisheh, mother of Pouya Bakhtiari, along with political activist Narges Mohammadi, mother of Ebrahim Ketabdar, Jafar Azimzadeh and Puran Nazimi, who had travelled to Shiraz to meet Navid Afkari's family, was arrested in front of Adel Abad prison in Shiraz and released after some hours. 

On Friday, July 7, 2021, several Iranian mothers for justice were arrested after gathering in Tehran's Azadi Square and chanting slogans in support of the Khuzestan protests and were released a few hours later. The mothers of Ebrahim Ketabdar, Pejman Gholipour, Farhad Mojdam, Sajjad Rezaei, Milad Mohagheghi, Vahid Damour, and the sister of Hamid Rasouli were among those arrested. Emphasising pursuing their right, they have emphasized in their slogans that they seek to overthrow the Islamic Republic. The mother of Pejman Qalipour, one of the victims of the November 2018 protests, said: "Enough with slavery, we are not asking you to support us, support yourselves."

On 11th July 2022, one day before a planned anti-hijab protest, Iran’s security arrested families of the victims of the 2019 protests accusing them of “trying to instigate riots”. 

Security forces raided the home of Rahimeh Yousefzadeh in Tehran on Monday and arrested her and two other mothers whose children were killed by the government during anti-government protests. Yousefzadeh is the mother of Navid Behboudi who was shot dead by security forces in Tehran in November 2019.

Several others, including Nahid Shirpisheh, the mother of Pouya Bakhtiari, and the brother of Vahid Damvar, another victim of government violence, were arrested at their own homes, also on Monday.

See also 
 Human rights in Iran
 Mourning Mothers
 Mothers of Khavaran
 Trial of Hamid Nouri
 Mahsa Amini

References 
 Iranian blogger's mother accuses authorities of killing him
 Brave mothers rise up to expose crimes of Iranian Revolutionary Guards
 Crime: Being a Mother
 Mourning Mothers of Iran Seek Justice
 https://abantribunal.com/
 Joint Statement: Iran Should Stop Persecuting Families Seeking Justice for State Atrocities
 Grieving In Iran: Mothers Brought Together By Tragic Deaths, State Pressure
 Witnesses at Iran Tribunal Describe Lost Children, Injuries, Abuses
 https://irantribunal.com/mothers-of-khavaran/the-history-of-mothers-of-khavaran/
 https://www.amnesty.org/en/documents/mde13/5441/2022/en/
 Islamic Republic Arrests ‘Mothers For Justice’ Ahead Of Hijab Protests
 November 2019: The 'Mourning Mothers' Become 'Mothers for Justice'
 Grieving Iranian Mother's Fight For Justice Puts Her In Authorities' Crosshairs
 Mothers of the victims of execution seek justice for the perpetrators
 Mothers of Khavaran Archives - Justice for Iran
 Iran is still waging war on the victims of its crackdowns
 Iranian Martyr's Mother Wants Justice
 Arrest of Justice-Seeking Iranian Mother Indicative of Authorities' Fear of Growing Movement
 Mass Arrest of November Victims’ Mothers and Social Activists
 (Video) Iran: Mothers of November 2019 Protests Victims Call for Accountability
 https://iran1988.org/
 Iranian Neda's mother calls for justice
 Justice for the victims of Iranian massacre
 Mourning mothers of Iran seek justice
 Families seek justice for Iran plane crash victims

External links 
 Official Twitter
 Official Instagram
 https://www.amnesty.de/informieren/amnesty-journal/iran-aufstand-der-jungen-und-zerlumpten

Iranian women activists
Iranian human rights activists
Human rights organisations based in Iran
Motherhood
Protests in Iran
2019–2020 Iranian protests
2017–2018 Iranian protests